Filip Mihaljević may refer to:
Filip Mihaljević (athlete) (born 1994), Croatian discus thrower and shot putter
Filip Mihaljević (footballer, born 1992), Croatian football forward
Filip Mihaljević (footballer, born 2000), Croatian football midfielder